Latirus rugosissimus is a species of sea snail, a marine gastropod mollusc in the family Fasciolariidae, the spindle snails, the tulip snails and their allies.

Description
The length of the shell attains 27.2 mm.

Distribution
This marine species occurs off Madeira.

References

 Gofas S. (2000). Four species of the family Fasciolariidae (Gastropoda) from the North Atlantic seamounts. Journal of Conchology 37(1): 7–16

External links
 Locard, A. (1897–1898). Expéditions scientifiques du Travailleur et du Talisman pendant les années 1880, 1881, 1882 et 1883. Mollusques testacés. Paris, Masson.

Fasciolariidae
Gastropods described in 1897